Donaldo González Barañano (born 27 November 1971 in Santiago de Veraguas) is a retired Panamanian football goalkeeper.

Club career
González had a six-year spell in Honduras with  Olimpia and Marathón, where he played alongside compatriot José Anthony Torres. Before moving abroad he played for Projusa de Veraguas, Bravos de Urracá and then local giants Tauro.

International career
González made his debut for Panama in a November 1996 friendly match against Costa Rica and has earned a total of 30 caps, scoring no goals. He represented his country in 10 FIFA World Cup qualification matches and was a member of the 2005 CONCACAF Gold Cup team, who finished second in the tournament. His final international was a September 2006 friendly match against Guatemala.

Retirement
After retiring in December 2007, González became goalkeeper coach of the national team. In summer 2015 he became goalkeeping coach at Atlético Chiriquí.

Honours and awards
C.D. Olimpia
Liga Nacional de Fútbol Profesional de Honduras (3): 2000–01 A, 2002–03 A, 2003–04 C

C.D. Marathón
Liga Nacional de Fútbol Profesional de Honduras (1): 2004–05 A

References

External links

1971 births
Living people
People from Santiago District, Veraguas
Association football goalkeepers
Panamanian footballers
Panama international footballers
1997 UNCAF Nations Cup players
2001 UNCAF Nations Cup players
2005 UNCAF Nations Cup players
2005 CONCACAF Gold Cup players
Tauro F.C. players
C.D. Olimpia players
C.D. Marathón players
Unión Deportivo Universitario players
Atlético Veragüense players
Panamanian expatriate footballers
Expatriate footballers in Honduras
Liga Nacional de Fútbol Profesional de Honduras players